Chairperson, Central Board of Indirect taxes and Customs or Chairperson, CBIC is the senior most IRS (C&IT) officer in the Government of India. The Chairperson is the ex officio Special Secretary to the Government of India and also cadre controlling authority of the Indian Revenue Service (Customs & Indirect Taxes). Vivek Johri, IRS (C&CE:85) is the present Chairman of Central Board of Indirect Taxes and Customs.

The Chairperson is equivalent to Secretary to Government of India and comes at position number 23 in Order of precedence of India.

The CBIC Chairperson is ex-officio special secretary and is under the direct charge of the Revenue Secretary of India. The Chairman of  Central Board of Indirect Taxes and Customs (CBIC) is appointed by Appointments Committee of the Cabinet (ACC) which is headed by the Prime Minister of India.

As the head of federal indirect tax administration, which touches the life of every Indian, the CBIC Chairperson plays a vital role in management of Indian economy and execution of economic policies of the government.

Emolument, accommodation and perquisites 
As the Chairperson, CBIC is of the rank of Secretary to Government of India, his/her salary is equivalent to Chief Secretaries of State Governments and to Vice Chief of Army Staff/Commanders, in the rank of Lieutenant General and equivalent ranks in Indian Armed Forces.

List of CBIC Chairpersons

See also
 Ministry of Finance (India)#Department of Revenue
 Indian Revenue Service
 Indian Revenue Service (Custom & Indirect Taxes)
 Directorate of Revenue Intelligence
 Taxation in India
 Goods and Services Tax (India)
 Taxation in India#Custom duty

References

External links
 Official Portal of the Indian Government
 Union Public Service Commission
 Organizational Chart of Central Board of Excise & Customs (CBEC) (archived in 2012 at Wayback Machine)
 Organisational setup of CBEC After Cadre Restructuring, NACEN, RTI, Kanpur, 19.02.2015

Custom and excise duties in India